Alexander Koch (born 18 May 1967) is a Swiss rower. He competed in the men's double sculls event at the 1992 Summer Olympics.

References

External links
 
 

1967 births
Living people
Swiss male rowers
Olympic rowers of Switzerland
Rowers at the 1992 Summer Olympics
Place of birth missing (living people)